Hewetson is a surname. Notable people with the surname include:

Al Hewetson (1946–2004), Scottish-Canadian writer
Christopher Hewetson, Irish sculptor
Christopher Hewetson (priest), English priest
Edward Hewetson, English cricketer
James Hewetson, Texas empresario 
Sir Reginald Hewetson, military general